The Mobshitters Motorcycle Club, is a "one-percenter" outlaw motorcycle club in Australia with around four chapters.

See also

 List of outlaw motorcycle clubs
 Criminal Law (Criminal Organisations Disruption) Amendment Act 2013

References

Outlaw motorcycle clubs
Gangs in Australia
1970 establishments in Australia
Organizations established in 1970
Organisations based in Sydney
Motorcycle clubs in Australia